Brock Wendel Yates (October 21, 1933 – October 5, 2016) was an American print and TV journalist, screenwriter, and author. He was longtime executive editor of Car and Driver, an American automotive magazine. In 1971 Yates, his son, and a friend developed and drove the first the Cannonball Baker Sea-To-Shining-Sea Memorial Trophy Dash (the Cannonball Run).

He was inducted into the Motorsports Hall of Fame of America in 2017.

Early life and career
Yates was the son of American author Raymond F. Yates. He was born and raised in Lockport, New York and graduated from Lockport High School in 1951.  Yates' first articles appeared in Science and Mechanics magazine when he was 16 years old.  He graduated from Hobart College and spent time in the United States Navy. 

Yates was a pit reporter for CBS' coverage of certain NASCAR Cup Series (at the time, the Winston Cup) series races in the 1980s, including the Daytona 500. He was also one of the main commentators on the TNN motor sports TV show American Sports Cavalcade with Steve Evans where, on occasion, Paul Page, Gary Gerould, and Ralph Sheheen appeared. He was a commentator on racing and vintage cars at various points between 1995 and 2013 for the Speed Channel, a U.S. cable affiliate of Fox Sports.

Yates was a best-selling author, most frequently about automotive topics and motor sport. Some of his articles and commentaries for Car and Driver magazine and other publications have had considerable impact within the auto industry and general public, beginning with his 1968 critique of the American auto industry, its management, and its products: "The Grosse Pointe Myopians." A recurring theme of his nonfiction work was the way American automotive management frequently grew arrogant, lost touch with its markets, and failed to respond to changing public needs/tastes, technology, and energy/environmental concerns.

Yates wrote for The Truth About Cars briefly in January and February 2008.

Cannonball Run
Yates was inspired by Erwin G. "Cannonball" Baker, (1882–1960), who set several coast-to-coast records, to initiate the Cannonball Baker Sea-To-Shining-Sea Memorial Trophy Dash. 

Conceived by Yates and fellow Car and Driver editor Steve Smith, the first run was intended both as a celebration of the United States Interstate Highway System and as a protest against strict traffic laws coming into effect at the time. Another motivation was the fun involved, which showed in the tongue-in-cheek reports in Car and Driver and other auto publications worldwide. The initial cross-country run was made by Yates; his son, Brock Yates, Jr.; Steve Smith; and friend Jim Williams beginning on May 3, 1971, in a 1971 Dodge Custom Sportsman van called the "Moon Trash II."

The first competitive race was won by Brock and Formula One and Le Mans winner Dan Gurney in a Sunoco blue Ferrari 365 GTB/4 Daytona. The duo traveled from New York to Los Angeles in a then-record time of 35 hours, 54 minutes. In all, five Cannonballs were run between 1971 and 1979, although Yates never again won. The event was the inspiration for the 1976 movies Cannonball! and The Gumball Rally.

The event has continued on in the form of the Tire Rack One Lap of America Presented by Grassroots Motorsport Magazine. The event is now run by his son Brock Yates, Jr.  2018 saw the 35th anniversary of the event.

Screenwriting
Yates along with director and stuntman Hal Needham, wrote Smokey and the Bandit II (1980). Yates also wrote the screenplay for The Cannonball Run (1981) film with the intention of giving the lead role to Steve McQueen. However, McQueen was diagnosed with cancer early in 1980 and was unable to do the film, leading to the casting of Burt Reynolds. Yates had a brief cameo in The Cannonball Run as the race organizer who lays out the ground rules before the beginning of the race.

While Yates was not involved in them, The Cannonball Run was followed by one sequel using his characters, Cannonball Run II (1984), and a second sequel, Speed Zone (1989), which, apart from being about the race and a small cameo by Jamie Farr's character, had no other connections.

Death
Yates died in Batavia, New York, on October 5, 2016, as a result of Alzheimer's disease, sixteen days shy of his 83rd birthday.

Bibliography
 Against Death and Time: One Fatal Season in Racing's Glory Years
 Cannonball!: World's Greatest Outlaw Road Race
 The Hot Rod: Resurrection of a Legend
 Enzo Ferrari: the man, the cars, the races
 The Critical Path
 NASCAR Off the Record
 The Indianapolis 500: The Story of the Motor Speedway
 Racers and Drivers
 The Decline and Fall of the American Automobile Industry
 Sunday Driver
 Dead in the Water
 The Great Driver
 Guide to Racing Cars
 Outlaw Machine: Harley-Davidson and the Search For the American Soul
 Umbrella Mike: The True Story of the Chicago Gangster Behind the Indy 500
 Sports and Racing Cars (written with Raymond F. Yates)

References

External links
 
 One Lap of America 
 The Truth About Cars 

1933 births
2016 deaths
Deaths from Alzheimer's disease
Deaths from dementia in New York (state)
Television personalities from Buffalo, New York
American magazine editors
Hobart and William Smith Colleges alumni
American reporters and correspondents
Motorsport announcers
American male screenwriters
Racing drivers from New York (state)
Trans-Am Series drivers
Military personnel from New York (state)
Writers from Buffalo, New York
American male journalists
20th-century American non-fiction writers
21st-century American non-fiction writers
Journalists from New York (state)
20th-century American male writers
Screenwriters from New York (state)
21st-century American male writers